Fulacunda is a town located in the Quinara Region of Guinea-Bissau.

References

Quinara Region
Populated places in Guinea-Bissau
Sectors of Guinea-Bissau